Vivian Stamatopoulos is a Canadian university academic and an advocate for better long term care in Ontario.

She is the founder of Canadians 4 LTC, and has authored widely cited papers on nursing standards and the support of young carers in Canada.

Education 
Stamatopoulos has both a Master's degree and a PhD in sociology from York University.

Career

Teaching 
Stamatopoulos is an associate professor at Ontario Tech University in Oshawa, where she lectures on sociology. 

Her research has been used to show the significantly worse support for young people who provide family care in Canada compared to the UK.

Long term care home advocacy 
Stamatopoulos has been advocating for better government oversight of long term care homes since before the COVID-19 pandemic but became prominent spokesperson during 2020. She advocates for stronger incentives to motivate improvements in long term care, government reform of rules, and criticized the Ontario Government for introducing legislation to absolve corporations from legal liabilities. In 2021 she advocated for government take over of failing care homes.

In May 2021, she spoke of the need for improved air conditioning in long term care homes. In June she was critical of personal support workers who posted TikTok videos mocking long term care residents.

Stamatopoulos has undertaken more than 200 expert interviews about long-term care during the COVID-19 pandemic.

She is the founder of Canadians 4 LTC.

Selected publications 

 Stamatopoulos et al, Nursing Home Staffing Standards and Staffing Levels in Six Countries, 2012, Journal of Nursing Scholarship, https://doi.org/10.1111/j.1547-5069.2011.01430.x
 Stamatopoulos V., Supporting young carers: a qualitative review of young carer services in Canada, 2015, International Journal of Adolescence and Youth, https://doi.org/10.1080/02673843.2015.1061568

Awards 
Stamatopoulos won the York University President’s University-wide Teaching Award in 2015, the Women Achiever Award in 2020, and the 2021 Doris Anderson award.

In 2021 she was recognised by the Toronto Star as one of the top 20 people who advocated for COVID-19 vaccinations, and was identified as a 2021 health hero by Canadian magazine Best Health.

References 

Living people
Year of birth missing (living people)
Academics from Ontario
York University alumni
Canadian health activists
Canadian founders
Ontario Tech University